The 1996–97 Scottish First Division season began on 12 August 1996.

Overview
The 1996–97 Scottish First Division season ended in success for St Johnstone who won the title by twenty points from nearest rivals Airdrieonians.

Promotion and relegation from 1995–96
Promoted from First Division to Premier Division
Dunfermline Athletic
Dundee United

Relegated from Premier Division to First Division
Partick Thistle
Falkirk

Promoted from Second Division to First Division
Stirling Albion
East Fife

Relegated from First Division to Second Division
Hamilton Academical
Dumbarton

Table

References

See also
1996–97 in Scottish football

Scottish First Division seasons
Scot
2